In human anatomy, the ligament of the head of the femur (round ligament of the femur, ligamentum teres femoris, the foveal ligament, or Fillmore’s ligament) is a ligament located in the hip. It is triangular in shape and somewhat flattened. The ligament is implanted by its apex into the antero-superior part of the fovea capitis femoris and its base is attached by two bands, one into either side of the acetabular notch, and between these bony attachments it blends with the transverse ligament.

It is ensheathed by the synovial membrane, and varies greatly in strength in different subjects; occasionally only the synovial fold exists, and in rare cases even this is absent.

The ligament of the head of the femur contains within it the acetabular branch of the obturator artery.

Function
The ligament is made tense when the thigh is semiflexed and the limb then adducted or rotated outward; it is, on the other hand, relaxed when the limb is abducted.

Research suggests it contributes little influence as a ligament past childhood, although it may still be important in transmitting arterial supply to the femoral head.

In humans, it has been suggested that it is not the ligamentum teres but the hip capsule (specifically the iliofemoral, ischiofemoral and pubofemoral ligaments) that provides the primary resistance to dislocation in the extended hip. However, recent research has suggested the ligamentum teres of the femur may have a number of functions, including a significant biomechanical role on the basis of cadaveric studies where increases of range of motion were seen after sectioning of the ligament.

Other animals
It has been suggested that some animals, such as the orangutan and Indian elephant, lack a ligamentum teres.  However, the presence of a ligamentum teres, albeit with a morphology different from the human version, has been found upon dissection in both these animals. In the orangutan, it is believed to play a significant role in preventing dislocation of the femoral head within extreme ranges of motion. In the Indian elephant, it is the primary support of the hip joint when the hind limbs are abducted.

References

Ligaments of the lower limb